In mathematics, Molien's formula computes the generating function attached to a linear representation of a group G on a finite-dimensional vector space, that counts the homogeneous polynomials of a given total degree that are invariants for G. It is named for Theodor Molien.

Here,  is the subspace of  that consists of all vectors fixed by all elements of G; i.e., invariant forms of degree n. Thus, the dimension of it is the number of invariants of degree n. If G is a compact group, the similar formula holds in terms of Haar measure.

Derivation 
Let  denote the irreducible characters of a finite group G and V, R as above. Then the character  of  can be written as:

Here, each  is given by the inner product:

Now, we compute the series:

Taking  to be the trivial character yields Molien's formula.

Example
Consider the symmetric group  acting on R3 by permuting the coordinates.  We add up the sum by group elements, as follows.
Starting with the identity, we have

 .

This gives three terms of the form

 

There is a two-element conjugacy class of cyclic permutations, yielding two terms of the form

 

Notice that different elements of the same conjugacy class yield the same determinant.  Thus, the Molien series is

 

On the other hand, we can expand the geometric series and multiply out to get
 

The coefficients of the series tell us the number of linearly independent homogeneous polynomials in three variables which are invariant under permutations of the three variables, i.e. the number of independent symmetric polynomials in three variables.  In fact, if we consider the elementary symmetric polynomials
 
 
 

See also Partition (number theory) and Representation theory of the symmetric group.)

References

David A. Cox, John B. Little, Donal O'Shea (2005), Using Algebraic Geometry, pp. 295–8

Richard P. Stanley, Invariants of finite groups and their applications to combinatorics, Bull. Amer. Math. Soc. (new series) 1 (1979), 475–511.

Further reading 
https://mathoverflow.net/questions/58283/a-question-about-an-application-of-moliens-formula-to-find-the-generators-and-r

Invariant theory
Representation theory of groups